The snowboarding competition of the Vancouver 2010 Olympics was held at Cypress Mountain. The events were held between the 15 and 27 February 2010.

Medal summary

Medal table

Men's events

Women's events

Competition schedule
All times are Pacific Standard Time (UTC-8).

Qualification
 For the six events, there are a maximum 190 athletes allowed to compete. This includes a maximum of 30 in parallel giant slalom, 40 in halfpipe, and 40 in snowboard cross for men and 25 in parallel giant slalom, 30 in halfpipe, and 25 in snowboard cross for women. No nation can have more than 18 snowboarders with maximum of ten men or ten women per specific nation. For each event, no nation can enter four skiers per individual event.

Skiers are qualified if they have placed in the top 30 in an FIS World Cup event of FIS World Championships in the event concerned. A minimum of 100 FIS points in the respective event. Host nation Canada is expected to enter a skier in all events. If no skier meets the qualification standards, they can enter one skier per event.

Quota allocation will be given using the World Ranking List (WRL) for the twelve-month period of World Cup Standings from the 2008–09 and 2009-10 Snowboard World Cup and the FIS Freestyle World Ski Championships 2009. It will be assigned one slot per skier from the top the WRL downwards. When a nation has the maximum four skiers per event, the next eligible nation on the WRL will be given a slot until the maximum total per event in moguls, aerials, and ski cross per gender has been reached.

In the case any nation is given more than 18 skiers, it is up the nation to select the team of a maximum of 18 skiers by 25 January 2010. Once quota slots are allocated by the FIS and the national entries confirmed, a reallocation of unused slots per event will be made by the FIS to the next eligible nation on the WRL for quota allocation in the respective event and gender. This process started on 18 January 2010 and will run until 28 January 2010. Deadline to VANOC is 1 February 2010.

Participating nations
Twenty-seven nations competed in the snowboarding events at Vancouver.

References

External links

May 2009 FIS Qualification for the 2010 Winter Olympics. - accessed 22 January 2010. Snowboarding is on pages 14–16.
Vancouver 2010 Olympic Winter Games Competition Schedule v12 
Associated Press: Olympic Snowboard Results

 
2010
2010 Winter Olympics events
2010 in snowboarding